Steve Johnson was the defending champion but chose not to compete.

Ernesto Escobedo won the title after defeating Enzo Couacaud 5–7, 6–3, 7–5 in the final.

Seeds
All seeds receive a bye into the second round.

Draw

Finals

Top half

Section 1

Section 2

Bottom half

Section 3

Section 4

References

External links
Main draw
Qualifying draw

Bendigo International - 1